Moolooloo Station (also known as Moolooloo and Moorillah Stations) is a pastoral lease that operates as a sheep station in South Australia.

 
The property was established in 1851 and originally known as Oratunga Station. John McKinley and his brother stocked the property with sheep and built a stone hut known as Howannigan, the ruins of which can still be seen today. John and James Chambers acquired the station in 1853. Five leases totalling  were taken up between 1853 and 1858. Copper was found by James Chambers and William Finke in 1857 along the southern boundary. The pair worked the deposit, establishing the Oratunga mine. The store at Moolooloo burnt down in 1861, with the Chambers losing a large supply in the resulting explosion. In 1863 the woolshed and adjoining sheep yards were destroyed by a fire that was started accidentally.

In 1870 Philip Levi's company disposed of many of its properties including Moolooloo and Wirrealpa, Oulnina and Wadnaminga, Mount Margaret and Booleroo Station. Together these properties were stocked with over 70,000 sheep and 3,000 cattle.

The shearers' quarters are used now for tourist accommodation.

The land occupying the extent of the Moolooloo pastoral lease was gazetted as two localities by the Government of South Australia on 26 April 2013 under the names Moolooloo and Moorillah.

See also
List of ranches and stations

References

Pastoral leases in South Australia
Stations (Australian agriculture)
Far North (South Australia)